Dexloxiglumide is a drug which acts as a cholecystokinin antagonist, selective for the CCKA subtype. It inhibits gastrointestinal motility and reduces gastric secretions, and despite older selective CCKA antagonists such as lorglumide and devazepide having had only limited success in trials and ultimately never making it into clinical use, dexloxiglumide is being investigated as a potential treatment for a variety of gastrointestinal problems including irritable bowel syndrome, dyspepsia, constipation and pancreatitis, and has had moderate success so far although trials are still ongoing.

References 

Cholecystokinin antagonists
Chloroarenes
Benzamides
Ethers